General Sir Charles James Napier,  (10 August 178229 August 1853) was an officer and veteran of the British Army's Peninsular and 1812 campaigns, and later a Major General of the Bombay Army, during which period he led the military conquest of Sindh, before serving as the Governor of Sindh, and Commander-in-Chief in India.

Early life
Charles James Napier was the eldest son of Colonel George Napier, and his second wife, Lady Sarah Lennox, with this being the second marriage for both parties. Lady Sarah was the great-granddaughter of King Charles II. Napier was born at the Whitehall Palace in London.

When he was only three years old his father took up an administrative post in Dublin, moving his family to live in Celbridge in County Kildare, Ireland, within walking distance of Lady Sarah's sister, Lady Louisa Conolly.  His early education was at the local school in Celbridge. At the age of twelve, he joined the 33rd Infantry Regiment of the British Army in January 1794, but quickly transferred to the 89th and did not immediately take up his commission, but returned to school in Ireland. In 1799, aged 17, he took up active service in the army as aide-de-camp to Sir James Duff.

Peninsular War
Napier commanded the 50th (Queen's Own) Regiment of Foot during the Peninsular War in Iberia against Napoleon Bonaparte. Napier's activities there ended during the Battle of Corunna, in which he was wounded and left for dead on the battlefield. Napier was rescued, barely alive, by a French Army drummer named Guibert, and taken as a prisoner-of-war. Nevertheless, Napier was awarded an Army Gold Medal after he was returned to British hands.

Napier recuperated from his wounds while he was being held near the headquarters of the French Marshal Soult and afterwards Michel Ney. On 21 March 1809, a British sloop approached Corunna with a letter for the commandant of the city, requesting information about the fate of Napier on behalf of his family. After an agreement between Ney and Napier, the latter was released on a convalescence leave at home for three months, under parole to return to Ney's quarters wherever he was on the first of July 1809.

Napier volunteered to return to the Iberian Peninsula in 1810 to fight again against Napoleon in Portugal, notably in the Battle of the Côa, where he had two horses shot out from under him, in the Battle of Bussaco, in the Battle of Fuentes de Onoro, and in the Battle of Badajoz (1812) (the second siege of Badajoz) in Extremadura, Spain, in which he was a lieutenant colonel in command of the 102nd Regiment of Foot. For his deeds at Bussaco and at Fuentes de Oñoro, Napier won the silver medal with two clasps.

Bermuda Garrison and American War of 1812

Napier subsequently served in Bermuda, where the 102 Regiment was posted in 1812 to the Bermuda Garrison, stationed at St. George's Garrison. Bermuda, part of British North America, was the main base in winter of the North America station of the Royal Navy, and his brother Henry Napier, at the time a naval lieutenant serving on a frigate that belonged to the station, was frequently in Bermuda. The American War of 1812 commenced with a declaration of war by the United States as the regiment was leaving England. In 1813, Lieutenant-Colonel, Sir Thomas Sydney Beckwith arrived in Bermuda to command a force tasked with raiding the Atlantic Seaboard of the United States, specifically in the region of Chesapeake Bay, with Napier as his Second-in-Command. Beckwith split the force into two brigades, one, composed of the 102nd Regiment, Royal Marines, and a unit recruited from French prisoners-of-war, was under Napier's command, and the other under Lieutenant-Colonel Williams of the Royal Marines. They took part in the Battle of Craney Island on 22 June 1813. The 102nd Regiment was in Maine at the cessation of hostilities (the Treaty of Ghent was signed on 24 December 1814 by the negotiators, ratified by the Prince Regent on 27 December, and by the United States President on 17 February, ending the war).

Napier served as governor of Kefalonia in the Ionian Islands, and wrote a book about the island.  Later he served on a diplomatic mission to Greece during its War of Independence, a conflict in which he had great sympathy for the Greeks.  He also wrote two more books on Greece and the Ionian Islands.

Return to England
In 1835, Napier was designated Governor of the planned new colony of South Australia, but he resigned the position, recommending William Light for the post. However, John Hindmarsh had already been lobbying for the position and had gained influential support, and was appointed to it.

Napier became the General Officer Commanding of the Northern District in England in April 1839.

Service as General Officer Commanding of the Northern District 
In April 1839, Napier was put in command of 6,000 troops in the Northern District, with one of his designated tasks being to confront the many Chartist protests active in the area. As a leftist who in principle agreed with the Chartist demands for Democracy, Napier made efforts to keep violence to a minimum and calm tensions in the area as best he could whilst still obeying his orders. Napier privately blamed "Tory injustice and Whig imbecility" for the conflicts, and pitied the Chartists rather than feared them.

Service in India

In 1842, at the age of 60, Napier was appointed Major General to the command of the Indian army within the Bombay Presidency. Here Lord Ellenborough's policy led Napier to Sindh Province (Scinde), for the purpose of quelling the insurrection of the Muslim rulers who had remained hostile to the British Empire following the First Anglo-Afghan War.  Napier's campaign against these chieftains resulted in victories in the Battle of Miani (Meanee) against General Hoshu Sheedi and the Battle of Hyderabad, and then the subjugation of the Sindh, and its annexation by its eastern neighbours as the Sind Division.

His orders had been only to put down the rebels: by conquering the whole Sindh Province, he greatly exceeded his mandate. Napier was supposed to have despatched to his superiors the short, notable message, "Peccavi", the Latin for "I have sinned" (which was a pun on I have Sindh). This pun appeared under the title 'Foreign Affairs' in Punch magazine on 18 May 1844. The true author of the pun was, however, Englishwoman Catherine Winkworth, who submitted it to Punch, which then printed it as a factual report. Later, Napier made several comments on the Sindh adventure to the effect of: "If this was a piece of rascality, it was a noble piece of rascality!"

On 4 July 1843, Napier was appointed Knight Grand Cross in the military division of the Order of the Bath, in recognition of his leading the victories at Miani and Hyderabad. He was also in 1843 given the colonelcy of the 97th (The Earl of Ulster's) Regiment of Foot, transferring later in the year to be colonel of the 22nd (The Cheshire) Regiment of Foot.

Napier was appointed Governor of the Bombay Presidency by Lord Ellenborough. However, under his leadership the administration clashed with the policies of the directors of the British East India Company, and Napier was accordingly removed from office and returned home in disgust. Napier was again dispatched to India during the spring of 1849, in order to obtain the submission of the Sikhs. However upon arriving once again in India, Napier found that this had already been accomplished by Lord Gough and his army.

Napier remained for a while as the Commander-in-Chief in India. He also quarrelled repeatedly with Lord Dalhousie, the Governor-General of India. The source of the dispute was Dalhousie's behaviour on India's north-west frontier. Dalhousie had requested repeated punitive raids against villagers who had not paid taxes. Napier was opposed to these tactics but accompanied a column of East India Company troops under Sir Colin Campbell and Punjab troops under George Lawrence. The Punjab troops were not under Napier's command and began burning villages on Lawrence's orders. "This was as impolitic as it was dishonourable to the character of British soldiers," protested Napier, "yet no power was entrusted to me, and I had been sufficiently cautioned against interfering with the Punjaub civil authorities."

Napier returned home to England for the last time. He was still suffering with physical infirmities which were results of his wounds during the Peninsular War, and he died about two years later at Oaklands, near Portsmouth, England, on 29 August 1853, at the age of 71. However his quarrel with Dalhousie was not over. In his posthumously published Defects, Civil and Military of the Indian Government (Westerton, 1853) he detected and condemned the growing superciliousness of the English in India towards the Indians; "The younger race of Europeans keep aloof from Native officers … How different this from the spirit which actuated the old men of Indian renown," he wrote. He proposed that British officers should learn the language of the natives and that native officers be appointed as ADCs and Companions of the Bath. "The Eastern intellect is great, and supported by amiable feelings", he wrote, "and the Native officers have a full share of Eastern daring, genius and ambition; but to nourish these qualities they must be placed on a par with European officers."
 
When revolt broke out in 1857, Napier's Defects was hailed as a prophetic work which correctly identified many of the seething tensions in the sub-continent. The problem was as one of his contemporaries observed "Had he made his representations with sober moderation, eschewing all offensive exaggeration, his warnings and suggestions would have commanded attention. Instead they were pooh-poohed as the emanations of a distempered mind."

Napier's former house is now part of Oaklands Catholic School of Waterlooville. Napier died on 29 August 1853 and his remains were buried in the Royal Garrison Church in Portsmouth.

Legacy

In 1903, the 25th Bombay Rifles (which as the 25th Regiment of Bombay Native Infantry had formed part of Napier's force in the conquest of Sindh) was renamed the 125th Napier's Rifles. Since amalgamated, it is now the 5th Battalion (Napier's) of the Rajputana Rifles.

A bronze in honour of Napier by George Gamon Adams (1821–1898) surveys from its plinth the southwest corner of Trafalgar Square, while a marble stands in the Crypt of St. Paul's Cathedral. In his bronze, he is shown bareheaded, in military uniform, with his cloak thrown back. His left hand is grasping his sword by the scabbard and raised above his waist, while his right, extended, holds a scroll symbolic of the government awarded to Scinde during his tenure of office. The monument was erected without ceremony on 26 November 1855 and paid for by means of public subscriptions, the most numerous contributors being private soldiers.

Some controversy was raised in October 2000 when Ken Livingstone, the newly elected mayor of London, requested that the statue of Napier and that of Major General Sir Henry Havelock be moved to less prominent positions, stating as his reason "I have not a clue who two of the generals there are or what they did", but these requests did not result in any action.

His remains lie in the now-ruined Royal Garrison Church, Portsmouth.  His tomb is immediately outside the west door of the church. A loose plaque in the church is thought to have indicated the burial place of Napier, inside what is now the west wall.

The city of Napier in the Hawke's Bay region of New Zealand is named after him. The suburb of Meeanee commemorates his victory in the Battle of Miani.

The city of Karachi in Sindh (Pakistan) earlier had a Napier Road (now Shahrah-e-Altaf Hussain), Napier Street (now Mir Karamali Talpur Road) and Napier Barracks (now Liaquat Barracks) on Sharah-e-Faisal. In the port area, there is also a Napier Mole. In Manora, the St. Paul's Church, erected in 1864, is a memorial to Napier. Karachi Grammar School named its second-oldest house "Napier". 

There is a residential area in Quetta named Napier Lines.
The Indian city of Jabalpur in Madhya Pradesh state has a neighbourhood called Napier Town.

Bibliography 

The Colonies, Treating of their Value Generally, of the Ionian Islands Particularly and Including Strictures on the Administration of Sir Frederick Adam (1833)
Colonization, particularly in Southern Australia: with some remarks on small farms and overpopulation (1835)
 Remarks on Military Law, and the Punishment of Flogging (1837)
A Dialogue on the Poor Laws (1838)
Lights and Shades of Military Life (1840)
A Letter to the Right Hon Sir J. Hobhouse, on the Baggage of the Indian Army (1849)
A Letter on the Defence of England by Corps of Volunteers and Militia (1852)
 Defects, Civil and Military, of the Indian Government (1853)
William the Conqueror, a Historical Romance (edited by Sir William Napier, 1858)

See also
Colonel George Napier (1751–1804), his father;
Lady Sarah Lennox (1745–1826), his mother;
and his brothers:
Sir George Thomas Napier (1784–1855), Commander-in-Chief of the Army in the Cape Colony
Sir William Francis Patrick Napier (1785–1860), soldier and military historian
Henry Edward Napier (1789–1853), naval officer and historian.

Notes

References

Further reading

Memorials & Monuments in the Royal Garrison Church Portsmouth

 Napier, Charles, Defects, Civil and Military of the Indian Government. Westerton, 1853.

Lieutenant William Edwards of the 86th Regiment and his 'Sketches in Scinde' , An essay about an important collection of illustrations by Napier's aide-de-camp Edwards (published London, 1846).

External links
 

 

|-

|-

|-

1782 births
1853 deaths
People from Westminster
People from County Kildare
British Army generals
British Commanders-in-Chief of India
English people of Scottish descent
British Army personnel of the Napoleonic Wars
British people of the Second Anglo-Sikh War
History of Sindh
Knights Grand Cross of the Order of the Bath
Charles James
33rd Regiment of Foot officers
Queen's Own Royal West Kent Regiment officers
Recipients of the Army Gold Medal
History of Tharparkar